= Anomic Records =

German record label

Anomic Records is a record label based in Berlin, Germany.

The label was founded by Leonard Kaage and Olga Karatzioti in 2020, initially as a means to release Kaage's Errorr project. Following this, Anomic began releasing music by other bands, such as The Dharma Chain, Kæry Ann, and SNIFF.

== Artists ==
- Camel Moon
- Dada Jung Riley
- The Dharma Chain
- Errorr
- Haus Band
- Jawbones
- Kæry Ann
- Kick
- Niko Novak
- Quiet Commotion
- San Marino
- Shybits
- Sniff
