= The Dharma Chain =

Australian rock band

The Dharma Chain are an Australian rock band based in Germany.

Formed in 2020 in Byron Bay, New South Wales, Australia, the band moved to Berlin, Germany at the end of 2022. That year they released Angry Young Folk, an album of folk music originally recorded during a period of lockdown during the COVID-19 pandemic in Australia. After signing to Berlin label Anomic Records, they released their next album Nowhere in 2024.

While their early material was likened to a fusion of 60s rock and 90s shoegaze, their album Nowhere included additional "neo-psychedelia" and "post-punk elements" which saw a shift in their sound. The band explained the move to Berlin influenced a more industrial sound and the use of more synthesisers.

== Discography ==
EPs

- The Dharma Chain (2021)
- Live at Funkhaus (2024)

Albums

- Angry Young Folk (2022)
- Nowhere (2024)
- Some Kind of Pure State (2026)
